Maria Millington Lathbury (1856 – 1944) was a classical scholar, archaeologist and numismatist. An alumna of Somerville College, she campaigned for Oxford University to award degrees to women. Along with Ethel Abrahams, she was one of the first female scholars of classical Greek dress. She married the archaeologist John Evans, and their daughter was the art historian Joan Evans.

Biography 
Lathbury was born in 1856, the daughter of Charles Crawford Lathbury of Wimbledon. In 1886, aged 30, she began to study Literae humaniores at the University of Oxford; her college was Somerville. Her interest in the classical world had been stimulated by Jane Harrison's "Extension Lectures in the Suburbs". At Oxford she was taught by Percy Gardner. Later she also travelled to Greece as a companion for a 'younger woman' in 1892. There some of the research for her subsequent book took place. She also joined one of Dörpfeld's tours of the Greek islands. In 1892 she also wrote a note in The Academy on the lighting within Greek temples.

Also in 1892, Lathbury married the archaeologist Sir John Evans. They had met at a lecture that Lathbury attended on "The Dates of some Greek Temples as derived from their orientation". They met again the following week at a dinner party and five months later were married. For a wedding gift, Evans gave Lathbury a Roman cameo, in a gold mount by Alessandro Castellani. They toured archaeological sites in Britain and France for their honeymoon, travelling with their mutual friend Nina Layard.

On 22 June 1893, their daughter Joan Evans was born at Nash Mills, Abbots Langley, Hertfordshire. In 1906 the family moved to Britwell, Berkhamsted. In 1908 her husband died; in his obituary Lathbury was described as a "classical scholar and keen antiquary".

She died in 1944.

Career 
After completing the examinations in the late 1880s, Lathbury was appointed as an Extension Lecturer for the university. She was also a 'lady lecturer' at the British Museum, focusing on Greek dress. In fact, along with Ethel Abrahams, Lathbury was one of the first female scholars of Greek Dress. Both scholars wanted their work to be accessible so that members of the public could recreate Greek styles of dress for themselves.

In 1891 she was interviewed in the Pall Mall Gazette with Jane Harrison, where they discussed the Greek world, archaeology and the character of female audiences for archaeological talks.

In 1892 she designed the costume for a production of Aristophanes' The Frogs.  In the following year her book, Chapters on Greek Dress, published and dedicated to OUDS ‘in remembrance of their performance of the Frogs of Aristophanes'.

Lathbury was one of those who campaigned for Oxford University to award degrees to women, in 1896.

In 1900 The Englishwoman's Yearbook & Directory listed her as a woman "active in archaeology".

Publications 
 Chapters on Greek Dress (London, 1893)
 'Hair Dressing on Roman Ladies as Illustrated on Coins' Numismatic Chronicle (1906)
 'A Silver Badge of Thetford' Numismatic Chronicle (1907)
 'Memorial Medal of Anne Eldred' Numismatic Chronicle (1908)
 'A Silver Plaque of Charles I as Prince' Numimatic Chronicle (1908)
 'Memorial Medal of Josiah Nicolson' Numismatic Chronicle (1909)
 'The Trentham Statue and the Sacerdotessa' The Burlington Magazine (1910)
 'Le Pontifical de Metz' Revue Archéologique (1912)
Lustre Pottery (1920)
 'Moorish Potters in France' The Burlington Magazine (1936)

Legacy 
Lathbury buried a time capsule on 20 July 1898, with a halfpenny and a handwritten note inside, to commemorate the construction of St Albans Museum, which her husband helped to found. A new capsule was re-buried on the same spot in 2018.

References 

1856 births
1946 deaths
19th-century archaeologists
20th-century archaeologists
British classical scholars
Women numismatists
Alumni of Somerville College, Oxford